The  was one of several major families descended from the Seiwa Genji, and numbered among the chief enemies of the Hōjō clan regents, and later the Ashikaga shogunate. The common ancestor of the Nitta, Minamoto no Yoshishige (1135 – 1202), was the elder brother of Minamoto no Yoshiyasu, the common ancestor of the Ashikaga clan. Yoshishige was the a landowner in the Nitta District of Kōzuke Province in present-day Gunma Prefecture. Yoshishige supported Minamoto no Yoritomo (1147 – 1199) in the Battle of Ishibashiyama of 1180 against the Taira clan.

The Nitta clan rose to importance in the early 13th century; they controlled Kozuke Province, and had little influence in Kamakura, the capital of the Kamakura shogunate, because their ancestor, Minamoto no Yoshishige had not joined his fellow clansmen in the Genpei War a century earlier.

In the 1330s, Nitta Yoshisada led the clan and a number of other Minamoto vassals against the Hōjō clan regents. They succeeded, in June 1333, in destroying the Bakufu's buildings in Kamakura.

The Nitta clan played an important role once again, allying with the Date clan and the Southern Courts, during the Nanboku-cho wars of the late 14th century.

The successive present head of a household
Nitta Yoshishige
Nitta Yoshikane
Nitta Yoshihusa
Nitta Masayoshi
Nitta Masauji
Nitta Motouji
Nitta Tomouji
Nitta Yoshisada

See also

Nitta Yoshiaki - son of Yoshisada
Nitta Yoshioki - son of Yoshisada
Nitta Yoshimune - son of Yoshisada
Wakiya Yoshisuke - brother of Yoshisada, and founder of a branch family of Nitta, called Wakiya

References

 
Minamoto clan